Metallolophia vitticosta is a moth of the family Geometridae first described by Francis Walker in 1860. It is found on Peninsular Malaysia, Sumatra and Borneo. The habitat consists of lowland forests and lower montane forests.

Adults are uniform brown with a pale zone along the forewing costa.

References

Moths described in 1860
Pseudoterpnini